Solus Operating System created by Solus Project and successor to:
SolusOS released May 9, 2012 and abandoned October 2013
The Solus Project, a video game